Henri Kadrnka is a retired Yugoslav-Swiss slalom canoeist who competed from the mid-1950s to the early 1960s. He won two medals in the C-2 team event at the ICF Canoe Slalom World Championships with a silver in 1957 and a bronze in 1959.

References

Swiss male canoeists
Yugoslav male canoeists
Possibly living people
Year of birth missing (living people)
Medalists at the ICF Canoe Slalom World Championships